Charles Graham "Chuck" Boyd (April 15, 1938 – March 23, 2022) was a four-star general of the United States Air Force.  Boyd was a highly decorated combat pilot who served in Vietnam and is the only Vietnam War prisoner of war (1966–1973) to reach the four-star rank (1992).  His final Air Force assignment was as deputy commander in chief, U.S. European Command, Stuttgart-Vaihingen, Germany.  He retired from the Air Force in 1995 and remained active in the national security realm, including as a program director of the Council on Foreign Relations and as president of Business Executives for National Security. He was a member of the guiding coalition of the Project on National Security Reform.

Biography
Charles Graham Boyd was born on April 15, 1938, near Rockwell City, Iowa. He entered the United States Air Force in April 1959.

Education
Boyd received his Bachelor of Arts degree from the University of Kansas in 1975, and earned his Master of Arts degree from the same in 1976. His military education included attending the  Air War College at Maxwell Air Force Base in Alabama in 1977.  In 1986, he participated in the Program for Senior Executives in National and International Security at Harvard University.

Air Force career
Boyd was commissioned as a second lieutenant through the aviation cadet program in July 1960 and served in a variety of assignments in Europe, the Pacific, and the Continental United States. A command pilot, with over 2,400 flight hours, he flew F-100s and F-105s in Southeast Asia during the Vietnam War. He was shot down on April 22, 1966 while
on his 105th mission. From 1966 to 1973 (2,488 days), he was a prisoner of war, interned in various prisons in North Vietnam.  During his captivity, Boyd was one of 52 Americans forced to participate in the Hanoi March, a propaganda event held in July 1966 in which U.S. prisoners of war were marched through the streets of Hanoi and brutally beaten by North Vietnamese civilians. He was released on February 12, 1973, as a part of Operation Homecoming. In a 2019 oral history interview with the Association for Diplomatic Studies and Training, Boyd reflected on the harshness of his captivity.

 It was particularly rough going for the first few years. Torture aside, I was colder, hotter and hungrier in North Vietnam than I have ever been in my life. I remember huddling in thin, cotton, pajama-like clothing, and only slightly thicker cotton blankets, with my cellmate trying to share body heat. It’s one thing to get cold then go inside to warm up, and something completely different to stay cold for months on end. I remember lying naked except for shorts on my wooden plank bed, inside a steel roofed cell block, with no windows, covered with heat rash, sweating continuously. When flies would land on me, I would hesitate to brush them off, thus exerting energy which I thought would make me hotter. Hunger was a constant. What food there was ranged from disgusting to barely edible. At times, we received so little that prisoners began to contract acute malnutrition diseases. A period of my life best forgotten.

Boyd was vice commander of Strategic Air Command's 8th Air Force, director of plans at Headquarters U.S. Air Force, Washington, D.C., and commander of Air University, with headquarters at Maxwell Air Force Base, Alabama, before becoming deputy commander in chief, U.S. European Command, Stuttgart-Vaihingen, Germany, which was his final assignment.

His Air Force assignments include:
 April 1959 – July 1960, student, undergraduate pilot training, Aviation Cadet Program, Greenville Air Force Base, Mississippi
 July 1960 – January 1961, student, F-100 combat crew training, Luke Air Force Base, Arizona, and Nellis Air Force Base, Nevada
 July 1961 – October 1963, F-100 fighter pilot, 510th Tactical Fighter Squadron, Clark Air Base, Republic of the Philippines
 October 1963 – August 1964, F-105 fighter pilot, 355th Tactical Fighter Wing, George Air Force Base, California
 August 1964 – November 1965, F-105 fighter pilot, 355th Tactical Fighter Wing, McConnell Air Force Base, Kansas
 November 1965 – April 1966, F-105 fighter pilot, 388th Tactical Fighter Wing, Royal Thai Air Force Base, Thailand
 April 1966 – February 1973, interned in various prisons throughout North Vietnam
 February 1973 – August 1973, repatriation orientation
 August 1973 – June 1975, undergraduate student, Air Force Institute of Technology, University of Kansas
 June 1975 – June 1976, graduate student, Air Force Institute of Technology, University of Kansas
 August 1976 – May 1977, student, Air War College, Maxwell Air Force Base, Alabama
 June 1977 – June 1979, special assistant to the chief of staff, Allied Forces Southern Europe, and executive officer to the chief of staff, Allied Air Forces, Southern Europe, Naples, Italy
 June 1979 – September 1980, chief of Western Hemisphere Division, Directorate of Plans, Headquarters U.S. Air Force, Washington, D.C.
 September 1980 – June 1982, deputy assistant director for Joint and National Security Council matters, Headquarters U.S. Air Force, Washington, D.C.
  June 1982 – July 1984, assistant director for Joint and National Security Council matters, Headquarters U.S. Air Force
 July 1984 – December 1986, deputy chief of staff for plans and programs, Headquarters U.S. Air Forces in Europe, Ramstein Air Base, West Germany. BGen Boyd played a major role in the deployment of Ground Launch Cruise Missiles in NATO.
 December 1986 – June 1988, vice commander of 8th Air Force, Barksdale Air Force Base, Louisiana
 June 1988 – August 1989, director of plans, Office of the Deputy Chief of Staff, Plans and Operations, Headquarters U.S. Air Force, Washington, D.C.
 August 1989 – January 1990, assistant deputy chief of staff for plans and operations, Headquarters U.S. Air Force, Washington, D.C.
 January 1990 – October 1992, commander of Air University, Maxwell Air Force Base, Alabama
  October 1992 – August 1995, deputy commander in chief, U.S. European Command, Stuttgart-Vaihingen, Germany

His promotions and dates of rank are:

Military awards and decorations
Boyd's major military awards and decorations include:

Air Force Cross citation
Boyd, Charles G.
Captain, U.S. Air Force
421st Tactical Fighter Squadron, 388th Tactical Fighter Wing, Korat Royal Thai Air Base, Thailand
Date of Action: 22 April 1966
The President of the United States of America, authorized by Title 10, Section 8742, United States Code, takes pleasure in presenting the Air Force Cross to Captain Charles Graham Boyd, United States Air Force, for extraordinary heroism in connection with military operations against an opposing armed force as a combat strike pilot of an F-105D Thunderchief of the 421st Tactical Fighter Squadron, 388th Tactical Fighter Wing, Korat Royal Thai Air Base, Thailand, in action approximately 35 miles northwest of Hanoi, North Vietnam, on 22 April 1966. On that date, Captain Boyd volunteered to participate in a flight with the mission of destroying Surface to Air Missile (SAM) Sites posing a threat to flights striking a bridge in the Phu Tho area. While attacking a hostile SAM site, Captain Boyd saw two missiles streak toward his aircraft. His superb airmanship and instant reaction enabled him to evade the missiles, which burst very near his aircraft. Without hesitation, Captain Boyd continued the attack on the hostile missile site. As he made a second pass through the intense flak which filled the sky around him, Captain Boyd's aircraft received a direct hit by anti-aircraft fire and he was forced to eject himself in a heavily populated, hostile area. The selfless act of making repeated attacks through intense ground fire after barely avoiding two missiles was far beyond the normal call of duty. Through his extraordinary heroism, superb airmanship, and aggressiveness in the face of hostile forces, Captain Boyd reflected the highest credit upon himself and the United States Air Force.

Post-military career and death
Following his retirement from the Air Force in 1995, Boyd served as strategy consultant to Speaker of the United States House of Representatives, Newt Gingrich.  From July 1998 he was executive director of the U.S. Commission on National Security for the 21st Century, whose final report in January 2001 predicted a growing threat to the United States from terrorism. He has also served as senior vice president and Washington program director of the Council on Foreign Relations.

From May 1, 2002, until December 31, 2009, he was the president and CEO of Business Executives for National Security (BENS), a national security public interest group. From December 14–17, 2009, Boyd led a delegation from BENS to Pyongyang, North Korea, to discuss economic issues with officials from the Democratic People's Republic of Korea government. Boyd remained involved with BENS as a member of the board of directors.

He was a member of the board of directors at defense electronics firm, DRS Technologies; graphics software firm, Forterra Systems; and venture capitalists In-Q-Tel, who support the work of the Central Intelligence Agency.

Boyd endorsed Joe Biden in the 2020 United States presidential election, the first candidate he had publicly ever endorsed. He died at the age of 83 on March 23, 2022, from lung cancer in Haymarket, Virginia.

Family
His second wife is Jessica Tuchman Mathews, former president of the Carnegie Endowment for International Peace.  Boyd's first wife, Millicent Ann Sample (23 April 1938 – 11 April 1994) is buried in Arlington National Cemetery. Boyd and Sample had two children, Jessica Marie and Dallas Graham Boyd.

See also

 List of United States Air Force four-star generals

Notes

References

External links
 

1938 births
2022 deaths
United States Air Force personnel of the Vietnam War
Harvard University people
Recipients of the Air Force Cross (United States)
Recipients of the Distinguished Flying Cross (United States)
Recipients of the Legion of Merit
Recipients of the Silver Star
United States Air Force generals
University of Kansas alumni
Vietnam War prisoners of war
People from Calhoun County, Iowa
Military personnel from Iowa
Recipients of the Air Medal
Recipients of the Air Force Distinguished Service Medal
Recipients of the Order of the Sword (United States)
Shot-down aviators
Wertheim family
Deaths from lung cancer in Virginia